The Cantabrian Water Dog is a landrace breed of dog developed in the coast of Cantabria, northern Spain, as an assistant to fishermen. The breed was classified and recognized by the Breeds Committee of the Spanish Ministry of Environment on 22 March 2011. It is recognised by the Royal Canine Society of Spain as a variety of the Spanish water dog.

History of the variety

The Cantabrian Water Dog is an ancestral population in the north of the Iberian Peninsula, whose origins seem to be common to Barbet. The breed is socially, culturally and historically rooted in the towns and villages of the whole coast of Cantabria and eastern Asturias. The work of this breed has been traditionally related to fishing work: collecting fishes that fell into the water, watching the ships when they were moored in port, taking the rope between ships and to the dock, or acting like a lifeguard.

Features
The population of Cantabrian Water Dog shows a clear morphological and genetic differentiation that allows discrimination from other dog populations in the same group with close geographic distribution. One genetic study place it as close to the Spanish Water Dog as to the Barbet or Caniche. These animals are lighter and shorter than those of the Spanish breed, where they were previously included. Thus, 75% of males and 38% of females would be excluded from the breed standard for height at the withers, while using the criterion of weight, 91% of males and 80% females would be excluded. The coat is wooly and curly, and the color can be black, brown, beige, or white. Males are normally under 20 inches at shoulder level. The life expectancy is about 12-14 years.

See also
 Dogs portal
 List of dog breeds

References

External links
 Cantabrian Water Dog Association 

Dog landraces
Rare dog breeds
Gundogs
Water dogs
Herding dogs
Dog breeds originating in Cantabria